Crisp 'n Dry is a brand of rapeseed oil manufactured by Edible Oils Limited and marketed by Princes Group. The manufacturer claims  this vegetable oil leaves food dry after frying (hence its name Crisp 'n Dry), compared to other vegetable oils which require the fried food to be dried with kitchen paper to absorb excess oil.

Crisp 'n Dry was previously marketed by Spry, then Unilever, before being acquired by Princes Limited.

Crisp 'n Dry contains no cholesterol and the block of Crisp 'n Dry no longer contains trans fat.

A long running advertising campaign for Crisp 'n Dry stated no matter what day of the week, it can turn any day into a fry day.

References

External links 

 

Cooking oils
Unilever brands
English brands